Hutchinson may refer to:

Places

United States 
 Hutchinson, Kansas
 South Hutchinson, Kansas
 Hutchinson, Minnesota
 Hutchinson, Pennsylvania
 Hutchinson, West Virginia, in Logan County
 Hutchinson, Marion County, West Virginia
 Hutchinson County, South Dakota 
 Hutchinson County, Texas
 Hutchinson Island (Florida) 
 Hutchinson Island South, Florida
 Hutchinson River, a river in New York
 Hutchinson River Parkway, running through Westchester County, New York, and the Bronx 
 Hutchinson Township, McLeod County, Minnesota

Greenland 
 Hutchinson Glacier

South Africa 
 Hutchinson, Northern Cape

People 
 Hutchinson (surname)

Companies 
Hutchinson SA, worldwide manufacturer of sealing solutions, insulation, fluid transfer systems and bicycle tires for all industries
Hutchinson (publisher), a publisher of books

Other uses 
Hutchinson Encyclopedia
, US frigate
Hutchinson's teeth, a sign of congenital syphilis
Hutchinson's ratio, concerning size differences between species 
Progeria, Hutchinson–Gilford progeria syndrome
Hutchinson Patent Stopper, an invention for replacing cork bottle stoppers
Hutchinson system, a system of plant taxonomy created by botanist John Hutchinson
Hutchinson Internment Camp, based on the Isle of Man during World War II

See also 
Hutch (disambiguation)
Hutchison (disambiguation)
Hutcheson
Hutchesson